Lilit Kamo Makunts (born 7 November 1983) is an Armenian philologist and politician who currently serves as the Armenian ambassador to the United States. Earlier, she served as the leader of the ruling My Step Alliance faction in the seventh National Assembly of Armenia and as Minister of Culture in the first cabinet of Nikol Pashinyan.

Biography and academic career
Makunts was born in the capital of Armenia, in Yerevan, on 7 November 1983. Between 1999 and 2003 she studied Romance and Germanic Philology at Yerevan State University from where she obtained a bachelor's degree. In the same faculty, between 2003 and 2004, she received a master's degree. Lilit Makunts got a candidate degree in philological sciences.

In 2005 she started teaching as an associate professor in the Russian-Armenian University, where she became the head of the Department of International Cooperation in February 2018. She also worked at the Peace Corps from 2016 to 2018.

Political career
For 8 years Makunts was member of the board of the Armenian Liberal Party and was leader of its youth organization between 2004 and 2012.

In the 2012 parliamentary election she ran as a candidate for the Armenian National Congress but did not get a seat in the National Assembly.

On 12 May 2018, on the proposal of Prime Minister Nikol Pashinyan, President Armen Sarkissian appointed Lilit Makunts Minister of Culture of Armenia. In the 2018 parliamentary election she was elected to parliament for the Civil Contract party and was elected leader of the My Step Alliance parliamentary faction in January 2019.

In August 2021, Makunts, who has no prior diplomatic experience, was appointed Ambassador of Armenia to the United States of America. Her appointment was the subject of criticism in Armenia and in the Armenian diaspora due to her lack of diplomatic experience.

See also
 Embassy of Armenia, Washington, D.C.

References

1983 births
Living people
Armenian philologists
Politicians from Yerevan
Yerevan State University alumni
Members of the National Assembly (Armenia)
Women government ministers of Armenia
Culture ministers of Armenia
21st-century Armenian women politicians
21st-century Armenian politicians
Members of the 7th convocation of the National Assembly (Armenia)
Civil Contract (Armenia) politicians